(+)-β-Pinene synthase (EC 4.2.3.122, (+)-pinene cyclase, cyclase III) is an enzyme with systematic name geranyl-diphosphate diphosphate-lyase [(+)-β-pinene-forming]. This enzyme catalyses the following chemical reaction

 geranyl diphosphate  (+)-β-pinene + diphosphate

Cyclase III from Salvia officinalis (sage) gives roughly equal parts of (+)-β-pinene and (+)-α-pinene.

References

External links 
 

EC 4.2.3